Christiaan Both (2 October 1895 – 11 October 1977) was a Dutch sports shooter. He competed at the 1936 Summer Olympics and 1948 Summer Olympics.

References

1895 births
1977 deaths
Dutch male sport shooters
Olympic shooters of the Netherlands
Shooters at the 1936 Summer Olympics
Shooters at the 1948 Summer Olympics
Sportspeople from Breda